Alena Popchanka (born 28 July 1979 in Gomel, Belarus) is a 4-time Olympic  freestyle and butterfly swimmer originally from Belarus. She swam for Belarus at the 1996, 2000 and 2004 Olympics. At the 2008 Olympics she swam for France; after her marriage to Frenchman Frédéric Vergnoux in early 2005.

Popchanka won the 200 m freestyle at the 2003 World Championships and won the 200 m freestyle again at the 2006 Short Course European Championships.

She married Vergnoux, her coach, in early 2005, and became a French citizen a few months following the marriage (June). In November 2005, Popchanka was cleared to swim internationally for France, following a 1-year sit-out from competition which was not waived by the Belorussian federation following her departure and last swim for Belarus at the 2004 Olympics. Because of this timing, Popchanka was unable to swim at the 2005 World Championships to defend her 200 m freestyle title from 2003.

Since November 2005, she has competed for France. Leading up to the 2008 Olympics, the couple lived in Edinburgh, Scotland, where Vergnoux coached from 2004 to 2008. Following the 2008 Olympics, Vergnoux and Popchanka moved back to France, after Vergnoux left his coaching job in Edinburgh for one in Paris.

Vergnoux is notable in his own right: during his time in Edinburgh, he was twice named British Coach of the Year. He also served on the British Olympic Team staff for the 2008 Olympics.

References

External links 
 
 

1979 births
Living people
Sportspeople from Gomel
Belarusian female freestyle swimmers
Belarusian female butterfly swimmers
French female freestyle swimmers
French female butterfly swimmers
Olympic swimmers of Belarus
Olympic swimmers of France
Swimmers at the 1996 Summer Olympics
Swimmers at the 2000 Summer Olympics
Swimmers at the 2004 Summer Olympics
Swimmers at the 2008 Summer Olympics
World Aquatics Championships medalists in swimming
European Aquatics Championships medalists in swimming